William Lidstone McKnight,  (18 November 1918 – 12 January 1941) was a Canadian aviator and flying ace of the Second World War. He was Canada's fifth-highest scoring ace of the war. McKnight joined the Royal Air Force (RAF) in early 1939 and served in No. 242 Squadron RAF during the final phase of the Battle of France, covering the Allied retreat from Brittany, and later the Battle of Britain.

McKnight's aircraft wore a distinct cartoon of a jackboot kicking Adolf Hitler on the port side of the engine cowling. His Hurricane also carried a human skeleton image which held a sickle in its hand under the cockpit, on both sides of the aircraft. McKnight scored 17 victories, as well as two shared and three unconfirmed kills. McKnight was shot down and killed on 12 January 1941 during a fighter sweep over Calais.

Early years
William Lidstone "Willie" McKnight was born in Edmonton, Alberta, Canada on 18 November 1918 and grew up in Calgary. He was considered a bit of a character at school and showed a rebellious streak. At Crescent Heights High School, he quarterbacked the football team but was renowned for once crashing his father's car into a neighbour's fence while trying to impress a new girlfriend.

In 1939, after entering the medical school at the University of Alberta, McKnight continued his cockiness but was on the verge of expulsion when a British recruiting mission for the Royal Air Force arrived in Calgary. Seeing a chance for adventure as well as leaving behind a turbulent romance with his girlfriend Marian, he enlisted as a prospective fighter pilot in February 1939 and sailed for England.

Second World War
Commissioned in the Royal Air Force (RAF) and appointed acting pilot officer on probation (41937), 15 April 1939, McKnight began training at No. 6 Flying Training School (FTS), Little Rissington, Bourton-on-the-Water, Cheltenham. While in training, he was nearly incorrigible, being confined to his barracks twice (for a fortnight) and, along with a classmate, being placed on open arrest as "perpetrators of a riot." Highjinks soon came to an end when Germany invaded Poland and the recruits in training were hurriedly graduated as fighter pilots.

McKnight was posted to No. 242 Squadron on 6 May 1940. The squadron had reformed on 30 October 1939 at RAF Church Fenton and initially had a large number of Canadian personnel on strength. The first aircraft assigned to the squadron were Blenheim MK IF twin-engine fighters but replacement Hawker Hurricane fighters were sent in January 1940. After transitioning to the more potent Hurricane, the squadron became operational on 24 March 1940.

Battle of France
As part of the British Expeditionary Force (BEF), McKnight and 242 Squadron began operations over France on 14 May, a detachment being based at French airfields. With the squadron partly stationed in England in reserve, four individual pilots (with six more following) were attached to other BEF units. McKnight flew with No. 615 Squadron at Abbeville, France, but the constant retreats necessitated three new relocations in six days. In typical McKnight style, he commandeered a limousine that had been abandoned by a "brass hat" and carried on a romantic encounter with a Parisienne (whom he eventually tried to smuggle back to England in a transport).

On 19 May 1940, McKnight scored his first victory while on an evening patrol over Cambrai. The four patrolling Hurricanes were "bounced" by two groups of Messerschmitt Bf 109s totaling 19 enemy fighters. Flying as the "tail-end Charlie," McKnight shouted a warning and wheeled into a steep climbing turn that brought him on the tail of one of the diving Bf 109s, which he shot down, his squadron's first kill over France.

On 21 May 242 Squadron pilots were withdrawn to Britain essentially to begin a seven days' leave which was abruptly cut short after 48 hours when was the retreating BEF and allied armies were pushed into Dunkirk. The squadron was rushed to RAF Manston and operated out of French airfields during daylight hours but returning in the evening. As fierce fighting over Dunkirk took place, McKnight claimed a victory over a Bf 109 on 28 May but his Hurricane was hit, and he had to limp home with his oil and coolant systems shot up. Over Dunkirk, in four days, McKnight shot down six enemy aircraft, eventually claiming 10 victories by 7 June 1940.

The constant combat had been telling on McKnight and he was admitted to hospital in July 1940 to recuperate. He had lost  in weight and was clearly suffering from sleep deprivation as well as a host of other ailments including stomach problems. While in hospital, he openly fretted over a squadron mate, P/O Stan Turner overhauling him as the top scorer.

Battle of Britain
No. 242 Squadron was badly mauled over France, losing 11 pilots and was reassembled at Coltishall with a new commanding officer, Squadron Leader Douglas Bader. In 242, he saw a squadron that needed to be "whipped back into shape" and he proceeded to establish his brand, selecting new flight commanders, requisitioning new equipment and eventually winning the approval of every squadron member, especially "Willie" McKnight. Bader saw his top ace as a surrogate son and chose him as a wingman.

By mid-July, 242 was declared operational again and joined No. 12 Group, Fighter Command. Throughout July and August although the Battle of Britain had raged over England, the industrial Midlands which the squadron patrolled did not receive heavy attacks. On 30 August 1940, the squadron relocated to RAF Duxford and was involved in action when a large formation of He 111s with Bf 109 and Bf 110 escorts was intercepted on a raid against RAF North Weald. Bader scored two victories while his "wingman" claimed two enemy Bf 110s and a He 111.

On 9 September, McKnight scored twice when enemy raiders were intercepted by a group of three squadrons that were coordinated into a single unit by Bader as part of his "Big Wing" plan. While trying to split the escorting fighters from the bombers, McKnight's Hurricane (bearing his irreverent individual marking of a death's head skull and skeleton with a sickle) was hit and one aileron was shot away. He barely made it back to his home base.

Another two kills took place on 18 September when McKnight brought down a Dornier Do 17 and shared in the destruction of a Junkers Ju 88. His final victory was over the Thames Estuary on 5 November 1940, McKnight disabled a Bf 109, pulling close and motioning for the enemy fighter pilot to lower his undercarriage in a sign of defeat. Instead the pilot (Fw Scheidt of Jagdgeschwader 26) bailed out over the Thames.

Promoted to flying officer, McKnight was awarded the Distinguished Flying Cross on 30 August 1940 and a Bar in September 1940.

Death
No. 242 Squadron was relocated to Coltishall in November 1940, followed by a further move to Martlesham Heath in December. On 12 January 1941, the squadron began a series of offensive sorties against targets in France, first acting as escorts for Blenheim bombers then beginning on 12 January, the first of the "Rhubarbs," low-level intruder attacks on targets of opportunity.

While strafing an E-boat in the English Channel, P/O M.K. Brown accompanying McKnight, broke off as the duo were under fire from anti-aircraft fire from the French coast just as a Bf 109 attacked. Brown made it back home but McKnight was listed as "missing." Recent research suggests McKnight fell to Fw. Brugelmann of Jagdgeschwader 26 (three kills). Bader was distraught at the loss of McKnight and vowed revenge, but 242's "top gun" was never found. Fellow Canadian ace Pilot Officer John B. Latta (seven kills and one shared) was also killed on this day.

Before his death in January 1941, McKnight had 17 kills, two shared and three unconfirmed credited to his score. Following is a list of victories:
 19 May 1940: one Bf 109
 28 May 1940: one Bf 109
 29 May 1940: two Bf 109s (one unconfirmed) and one Do 17
 31 May 1940: two Bf 110s and one Bf 109
 1 June 1940: shot down two Ju 87s (two more unconfirmed)
 14 June 1940: two Bf 109s (recorded in his log book)
 30 August 1940: two Bf 110s and one He 111
 9 September 1940: two Bf 109s
 18 September 1940: one Do 17 and a half Ju 88 (shared)
 5 November 1940: forced down a Bf 109 (shared)

Flying Officer McKnight has no known grave; his name is inscribed on the Runnymede Memorial, Englefield Green, Egham, Surrey, United Kingdom.

Calgary's McKnight Boulevard is named after him.

References
 Willie McKnight at acesofww2.com

Notes

Bibliography

 Halliday, Hugh. The Tumbling Sky. Stittsville, Ontario: Canada's Wings, 1978. .
 Holmes, Tony. Hurricane Aces 1939 – 1940. London: Osprey Publishing. 1998. 
 Ralph, Wayne. Aces, Warriors and Wingmen: The Firsthand Accounts of Canada's Fighter Pilots in the Second World War. Toronto: Wiley, 2005. .
 Shores, Christopher and Clive Williams. Aces High. London: Grub Street, 1994. .

Royal Air Force officers
Canadian World War II flying aces
Canadian World War II pilots
The Few
Recipients of the Distinguished Flying Cross (United Kingdom)
1941 deaths
Royal Air Force personnel killed in World War II
Aviators killed by being shot down
1918 births
Royal Air Force pilots of World War II